When the Wind Forgets Your Name is the ninth studio album by American indie rock band Built to Spill. It was released on September 9, 2022, by Sub Pop.

Track listing
All the tracks are written and produced by Doug Martsch.

Personnel
From the album's liner notes.

Musicians
 Doug Martsch – guitar, keys, vocals
 Lê Almeida – drums, percussion
 João Casaes – bass
 Josh Lewis – piano

Production
 Built to Spill – production
 Built to Spill, Lawrence Bishop and Josh Lewis – recording and mixing
 Mell Dettmer – mastering

Design
 Alex Graham – artwork
 João Casaes and Le Almeida – inside collage
 Built to Spill, Alex Graham and Jeff Kleinsmith – art direction
 Jeff Kleinsmith – design

References

2022 albums
Built to Spill albums
Sub Pop albums